The National Science Foundation CAREER awards, presented by the National Science Foundation (NSF), are in support of junior faculty who exemplify the role of teacher-scholars through research and education, and the integration of these endeavors in the context of their organizations' missions. The awards, presented once each year, include a federal grant for research and education activities for five consecutive years.

History 
The Presidential Young Investigators (PYI) program was initiated in 1983, and remained active until the NSF New Young Investigators (NYI) program replaced it in 1992. Both programs were research-oriented, and funded an average of 200 faculty members per year. Another, more selective program began in 1992, when the White House asked NSF to institute the Presidential Faculty Fellows (PFF) program. It awarded young faculty up to $100,000 per year for five years, with no matching-fund option, and put more emphasis on education and outreach. In 1994, the Faculty Early Career Development (CAREER) program was approved by NSF's National Science Board, and the first awards were presented in FY 1995. Several existing NSF programs and their objectives were merged into CAREER.

In 1996, the Presidential Early Career Awards for Scientists and Engineers (PECASE) program was instituted, replacing the PFF Awards. Beginning in FY 1997, the NSF selected nominees from among the "most meritorious first-year CAREER awardees supported by the CAREER program." The same year, the CAREER program announcement termed CAREER "a premier program." When a CAREER awardee is granted a PECASE award, funding is raised to a maximum of $500,000 over a five-year period. A maximum of 20 PECASE awards are granted per year to NSF nominees (and 40 more to nominees of other federal agencies).

References

National Science Foundation
Science education in the United States
American education awards
Awards established in 1983
Career awards
Faculty awards
1983 establishments in the United States